Konga is a 1961 technicolour science fiction horror film directed by John Lemont and starring Michael Gough, Margo Johns and Austin Trevor. It was shot at Merton Park Studios and in Croydon for Anglo Amalgamated, then distributed in the United States by American International Pictures (AIP) as a double feature with Master of the World. Anglo Amalgamated and AIP each provided half the funding for the US$500,000 film, with each studio receiving distribution rights in their respective hemispheres.

Konga was the basis for a comic book series published by Charlton Comics and initially drawn by Steve Ditko (prior to Ditko's co-creation of Spider-Man) in the 1960s.

The film epitomises the B-movie in terms of illogical plot and shortcut special effects, such as a man in a gorilla suit replacing special effects. Shots of screaming people looking upwards invoke the idea that they are looking up to Konga and it is not explained how the serum changes species as well as size (chimp to gorilla).

Plot
British botanist Dr. Charles Decker comes back from Africa after a year, presumed dead. During that year, he came across a way of growing plants and animals to an enormous size. He brings back a baby chimpanzee, named Konga, to test out his theory. Decker goes insane after he discovers a serum that turns his chimpanzee subject into a ferocious gorilla-sized ape. To further his hideous experiments, he mesmerizes the ape and sends it to London to kill all of his enemies who have more credit in the scientific community than he already has. Among his targets are Dean Foster, Professor Tagore, and Bob Kenton, the lover of Sandra Banks, the woman that the doctor wants for himself.

During a field trip to the woods with a group of his students he makes an inappropriate advance to Sandra. He is later confronted by her boyfriend Bob and, although seeming to concede to Bob, sends Konga to strangle him.

Decker's assistant and lover Margaret sees him ask Sandra to become both his new assistant and his lover, then sexually assault Sandra when she refuses.  Margaret attempts to get even by hypnotizing Konga into obeying her, then giving him an enormous amount of the strange serum, which turns him into an enormous monster, at which point she becomes his first victim. He keeps growing, and bursts through the roof of the house.

Seeing Decker still attacking Sandra in the greenhouse, the super-sized ape grabs Decker in one of his enormous hands, while Sandra's arm is seized by one of Decker's carnivorous plants (her ultimate fate is not shown). His rampage comes to a stop when he is shot down by heavily armed soldiers, after he throws Decker to his death. Upon his demise, Konga changes back to a baby chimpanzee.

Cast

 Michael Gough as Dr. Charles Decker
 Margo Johns as Margaret
 Jess Conrad as Bob Kenton
 Claire Gordon as Sandra Banks
 Austin Trevor as Dean Foster
 Jack Watson as Superintendent Brown
 George Pastell as Professor Tagore
 Vanda Godsell as Mrs. Kenton
 Stanley Morgan as Inspector Lawson
 Grace Arnold as Miss Barnesdell
 Leonard Sachs as John Kenton
 Nicholas Bennett as Daniel
 Kim Tracy as Mary 
 Rupert Osborne as Eric Kenton
 Waveney Lee as Janet Kenton 
 John Welsh as Commissioner Garland
 Paul Stockman as Konga (uncredited)

Production
Following the success of Herman Cohen's previous British made film Horrors of the Black Museum that also featured Michael Gough, Nat Cohen (who was no relation to Herman) of Anglo-Amalgamated asked Cohen for another exploitation film.

As Cohen had long admired King Kong, he thought of a giant ape film shot in colour. Due to Cohen's success with his I Was a Teenage Werewolf (1957), AIP used "I Was a Teenage Gorilla" as the working title. Cohen paid RKO Pictures $25,000 for the rights to the name of Kong for exploitation purposes. Cohen recalled that the special effects for the film, that was one of the first giant monster movies shot in colour (Eastmancolor), took 18 months to complete.

The climactic scene in London streets was possible when the producer convinced the police that the scenes could be effectively staged late at night on essentially empty streets. A combination of miniature sets, an actor in a gorilla suit, and use of studio mattes also made the technical aspects of the production look better than its meagre budget would otherwise have allowed.

An unknown (and uncredited) actor named Paul Stockman was the man inside the ape suit. In an interview, he revealed "How I came to get the part of Konga: my agent told me there was an American producer looking for a six-foot actor. Would I go to Mac’s Rehearsal Rooms, Leicester Square, London? So I toddled along; I walked into the room and there’s 20 six-foot tall blokes! I thought, "Oh, dear, it’s a lineup!" Anyway, the producer Herman Cohen came in carrying a big cardboard box. He said, "The actor I need must be exactly six foot, so if you’re six foot, one or five foot, eleven, thank you for coming but you won’t do." So everybody left except three, two other guys and myself. The producer then opened a cardboard box and took out the gorilla headpiece. He said, "Now I’d like all three of you to try this on because the guy who gets the part will have to wear this six to eight hours a day, so see how you feel with it." So, we each put the gorilla head on. The other two had blue eyes and I’ve got brown eyes. And we all knew a gorilla has brown eyes. So that was how I got the part!"

Reception
Konga appeared as part of a double feature with Master of the World (1961). The film was reviewed in The New York Times, where the film critic Eugene Archer noted it played to "misplaced guffaws" and was further described as: "... the British 'Konga' is nothing more than an overblown 'King Kong,' hammily played by Michael Gough and an improbable-looking ape."

In a later Time Out film review, Konga was considered: "Inept, silly, and ludicrously enjoyable monster movie, with Gough as the mad boffin who injects a chimp with a growth serum, only to see it turn into an uncredited actor in a gorilla suit. Thereafter the ape grabs a Michael Gough doll and heads for Big Ben. Deeply political."

Novel and comic book adaptations
A novelization of the film was released in paperback at the time of its original release (Konga by Dean Owen (real name: Dudley Dean McGaughey) (Monarch Books 1960)).

From 1960 to 1965, Charlton Comics published 23 issues of the comic book Konga. It included work by Spider-Man co-creator Steve Ditko. The series was renamed Fantastic Giants with issue #24, which turned out to be the last issue of the series.

Konga also appeared in a three-issue miniseries that started off as The Return of Konga, before it was renamed Konga's Revenge with issue #2. The series ran from 1962 to 1964. This was followed by a one-shot reprint of issue #3 in 1968.

In 1990, Steve Ditko illustrated a back-up story in Web of Spider-Man Annual #6 called "Child Star". In this story, Captain Universe creates huge versions of toys based on Gorgo and Konga to battle giant monsters that are attacking the neighborhood. For copyright reasons, Konga's name was altered to "Kongo". This sequence was Ditko paying homage to his earlier work with these two characters in their 1960s Charlton Comics comic book series.

Some of these issues were reprinted (in black and white) in a trade paperback in 2011 called Angry Apes n' Leapin Lizards.

In August 2013, IDW Publishing reprinted all the issues that artist Steve Ditko worked on (Konga #1 and 3–15 and Konga's Revenge #2)  as a deluxe hardcover collection called Ditko's Monsters: Konga!.

In April 2019, IDW published a book called Ditko's Monsters: Gorgo vs. Konga which collected issues #5 and 6 of the series.

Home media
Konga was released to DVD by MGM (the successor-in-interest to AIP) in Region 1 first on December 6, 2005 as a standard full screen disc and then on September 11, 2007 in Region 1 as part of MGM's 'Midnite Movies' collection in a double bill with Yongary, Monster From The Deep on the first disc and Konga on the second, and also to Blu-Ray by KL Studio Classics (under license from MGM) on December 3, 2019 in a 'Special Edition' with the movie presented in a 2K master print and with special features included (radio spot, image gallery, and the theatrical trailer.)

References
Notes

Citations

Bibliography

 Heffernan, Kevin. Ghouls, Gimmicks, and Gold: Horror Films and the American Movie Business, 1953-1968. Durham, North Carolina: Duke University Press, 2004. .
 Pym, John, ed. "Konga." Time Out Film Guide. London: Time Out Guides Limited, 2004. .
  Weaver, Tom. "Herman Cohen Interview". Attack of the Monster Movie Makers: Interviews With 20 Genre Giants. Jefferson, North Carolina: McFarland & Company, 1994. .

External links

 
 
 
 
Konga (character) at Don Markstein's Toonopedia.  at Don Markstein's Toonopedia. Archived from the original on December 2, 2015.

1961 films
1961 horror films
American International Pictures films
1960s monster movies
British science fiction horror films
1960s English-language films
Films about apes
Films adapted into comics
Films directed by John Lemont
Films set in London
Giant monster films
British monster movies
Films about size change
1960 comics debuts
Charlton Comics titles
Comics based on films
Mad scientist films
1960s science fiction horror films
1960s British films
British independent films